Long Ding (born February 11, 1988) is a Chinese college athlete who plays American football as kicker. He was originally a member of the IFAF/USA Football International Student Program, before entering college football after his arrival in the United States in 2007.

Early life
Ding is a native of Qingdao, China.

College career

Dean College
After his arrival in the US, Dean College in Franklin, Massachusetts was the first team that Ding represented before moving onto Norwich University in Northfield, Vermont.

Norwich University
In 2011, while still a student at Norwich University, Ding was named a finalist for the Fred Mitchell Award. Ding was also active as a defensive player, recording nineteen tackles, six tackles for loss and three sacks.

Professional career

NFL Combine
He was scouted during the NFL Regional Combine in New York City, as well as the NFL Super Regional Combine in Detroit. He later went on to go undrafted in the 2012 NFL Draft.

Jacksonville Jaguars
In May 2012, Ding was invited to a tryout at rookie mini-camp for the Jacksonville Jaguars, along with twenty-six others. Ding stated that he just wants to show the NFL that he has the ability to kick at that level. The Jaguars did not sign Ding to a contract.

References

External links
 Long Ding's webpage

1988 births
American football placekickers
American sportspeople of Chinese descent
Dean College alumni
Living people
Norwich University alumni
Norwich Cadets football players
Sportspeople from Qingdao